Spotlight on Corruption is a British nonprofit organization which focuses on financial corruption.

The previous organization Corruption Watch UK was established in 2009 by Susan Hawley, who was its policy director for 10 years and is  the executive director of Spotlight on Corruption. It divided to form two bodies, Spotlight on Corruption and Shadow World Investigations.

The chair of Spotlight on Corruption's board is Elizabeth David-Barrett, professor of governance and integrity and director of the Centre for the Study of Corruptionat the University of Sussex.

References

External links
 

Corruption in the United Kingdom